Rostamabad (also Romanized as Rostamābād) is a village in Jamabrud Rural District, in the Central District of Damavand County, Tehran Province, Iran. At the 2006 census, its population was 19, in 7 families.

References 

Populated places in Damavand County